Arno Kalervo Anthoni (11 August 1900 – 9 August 1961) was a Finnish lawyer who was the director of the Finnish State Police Valpo in 1941–1944. He was openly antisemite and pro-Nazi, having close relations to the German Sicherheitspolizei. Anthoni and the Minister of Interior Toivo Horelli were responsible for the deportation of 135 German refugees, including 12 Jews, Finland handed over to the Nazis in 1941–1943.

Career

Early years 
Anthoni was born to the family of the lawyer Väinö Ossian Anthoni (1868–1933). After graduating the University of Helsinki in 1927, Anthoni worked as a lensmann (Finnish: ″nimismies″) in the Kymenlaakso region. In 1933, he was appointed the police director of the Uusimaa Province.

Wartime 
In February 1941, Anthoni became the director of the State Police. As Finland joined the war in June 1941, Germany started pressing the Finnish government to deport the refugees who had fled to Finland after the 1938 Anschluss.

In April 1942, Anthoni visited Berlin where he discussed with Heinrich Müller, Friedrich Panzinger and Adolf Eichmann over the ″Final Solution″ plan concerning the Jews of Finland. Gestapo asked them to be handed over to the German authorities, which Anthoni reacted positively. He made a verbal agreement on expelling all German refugees Finland saw as ″unwanted element″. The agreement also included Russian POWs of Jewish origin.

Although the Finnish government refused transferring its own Jewish citizens, Anthoni's trip caused a mass deportation of ″disagreeable aliens″ in June 1942. Among the deported were two German-born Jews. The matter was also discussed on Heinrich Himmler's visit to Finland in the late summer of 1942. The Minister of Interior Toivo Horelli and Anthony soon made a classified decision on the deportation of 27 refugees, of whom 8 were Jews. On 8 November 1942, the deported were shipped to the Estonian capital Tallinn and handed over to the Gestapo. According to the documents found in the Estonian state archives, the Jews were killed just two days later. The intention was to deport all Jewish refugees but the plan was revealed. After the intervention of the Social Democratic cabinet members Väinö Tanner and K.-A. Fagerholm the deportations were stopped.

In late 1942, Anthoni asked Horelli to make a requisition for awarding the SS commander Martin Sandberger with the Order of the White Rose of Finland. Sandberger was the commander of the Sicherheitspolizei and Sicherheitsdienst in Estonia.

After the war 
As it was clear that Germany was going to lose the war, Anthoni was dismissed in March 1944. After the Moscow Armistice, he fled to Sweden but was soon returned. Anthoni was arrested in the Ostrobothnian village of Rautio in April 1945, and put into preventive detention.

Anthoni never faced the Finnish war-responsibility trials. Poland and the Western Allies wanted Anthoni, Horelli and the State Police officer Ari Kauhanen to be included on the list of war criminals, but the Soviet Union never made a claim to the Finnish government. This was most likely because the Soviets focused on persons who had committed war crimes against their citizens.

In early 1948, Anthoni was put in trial for misconduct. He was accused of the transfer of 76 German refugees to the Gestapo in 1942–1943. Anthoni claimed having no idea of what would happen to the Jews, and told that the deported were chosen by Horelli. In reality, Horelli had given Anthoni a complete freedom to make decisions on his own. As the Allied Commission left Finland in May 1948, Anthoni was released. The case went to the Supreme Court which dismissed the indictment in February 1949. Anthoni was only given an admonition for negligent misconduct.

Anthoni worked his last years as a lawyer for the mineral company Oy Lohja Ab, owned by the prominent Finnish Nazi Petter Forsström. He died at the Malmi Hospital in Helsinki.

References 

1900 births
1961 deaths
People from Uusimaa Province (Grand Duchy of Finland)
University of Helsinki alumni
Finnish people of World War II
Antisemitism in Finland
Holocaust perpetrators
Refugees in Finland
20th-century  Finnish  lawyers